Headstunts is The Datsuns' fourth studio album, released on 6 October 2008. It was recorded in early 2008 in Sweden and was self-produced. It is the first album The Datsuns recorded with new drummer Ben Cole.

The title of the album, Headstunts is an anagram of the band's name.

Track listing
"Human Error"
"Hey! Paranoid People! (What's In Your Head?)"
"Your Bones"
"Ready, Set, Go!"
"Yeah, Yeah, Just Another Mistake"
"Eye of the Needle"
"So Long"
"Cruel Cruel Fate"
"Highschool Hoodlums"
"Cry Crybaby"
"Pity Pity Please"
"Somebody Better"

References

2008 albums
The Datsuns albums
Cooking Vinyl albums